The Brothers! is an album by the tenor saxophonists Al Cohn, Bill Perkins and Richie Kamuca recorded in 1955 for the RCA Victor label.

Reception

The Allmusic review by Scott Yanow stated "The music is fun and swinging if not all that original or distinctive".

Track listing
 "Blixed" (Bill Potts) - 3:48
 "Kim's Kaper" (Bill Perkins) - 3:13
 "Rolling Stone" (Bob Brookmeyer) - 3:08
 "Sioux Zan" (Nat Pierce) - 3:08
 "The Walrus" (Al Cohn) - 2:48
 "Blue Skies" (Irving Berlin) - 3:12
 "Gay Blade" (Brookmeyer) - 3:17
 "Three of a Kind" (Pierce) - 3:13
 "Hags!" (Potts) - 3:19
 "Pro-Ex" (Perkins) - 3:04
 "Strange Again" (Potts) - 3:19
 "Cap Snapper" (Cohn) - 3:39
 "Memories of You" (Andy Razaf, Eubie Blake) - 3:02 Bonus track on CD reissue
 "Saw Buck" (Pierce) -	3:18 Bonus track on CD reissue
 "Chorus for Morris" (Pierce) - 3:19 Bonus track on CD reissue
 "Slightly Salty" (Richie Kamuca) - 3:15 Bonus track on CD reissue
Recorded at Webster Hall in New York City on June 24 (tracks 2, 3, 6-8, 10, 13 & 16) and June 25 (tracks 1, 4, 5, 9, 11, 12, 14 & 15), 1955

Personnel 
Al Cohn, Bill Perkins and Richie Kamuca - tenor saxophone
Hank Jones - piano
Barry Galbraith (tracks 2, 3, 6-8, 10, 13 & 16), Sam Beethoven (tracks 1, 4, 5, 9, 11, 12, 14 & 15) - guitar
John Beal - bass
Chuck Flores - drums
Bob Brookmeyer (tracks 3 & 7), Al Cohn (tracks 5, 6, 12, 13 & 16), Bill Perkins (tracks 2 & 10), Nat Pierce (tracks 4, 8, 14 & 15), Bill Potts (tracks 1, 9 & 11) - arranger

References 

1956 albums
RCA Records albums
Al Cohn albums
Bill Perkins (saxophonist) albums
Collaborative albums